Two highways, none of which were designated as only a state route, in the U.S. state of California have been signed as Route 5:
 Interstate 5 in California
 California State Route 5 (1934), now part of Route 35